Cocoa Crater is a cinder cone in the Stikine Country of northwestern British Columbia, Canada. Cocoa Crater is one of the 30 cinder cones around the Mount Edziza complex that formed in the year 700. The ash around Cocoa Crater is quite deep, its summit is a jet black color and its summit is red. It is quite a different color from the brown color of Coffee Crater, which is to the south of Cocoa Crater.

See also
Mount Edziza
Northern Cordilleran Volcanic Province
List of volcanoes in Canada
List of Northern Cordilleran volcanoes
Volcanic history of the Northern Cordilleran Volcanic Province
Volcanism of Canada
Volcanism of Western Canada

References

Mount Edziza volcanic complex
Cinder cones of British Columbia
Holocene volcanoes
Monogenetic volcanoes
Two-thousanders of British Columbia